Hong Peiyun (born January 7, 2001, in Shanghai, China) is a Chinese idol singer. She is a member of Team HII of Chinese idol group SNH48, as well as its sub-unit, Color Girls.

Career
On 25 July 2015, during SNH48's second General Election, Hong Peiyun was announced as one of the fifth-generation members of SNH48. On 9 December, she made her first public performance during Team XII's first stage, "Theater no Megami".

On 20 April 2016, Hong became part of SNH48's sub-unit, Color Girls. On 30 July, during SNH48's third General Election, she was ranked 31st with 16288.2 votes, becoming part of the Under Girls.

On July 29, 2017, during SNH48's fourth General Election, Hong came in 49th with 18878.7 votes, meanwhile becoming the center for Future Girls.

On February 3, 2018, during SNH48's fourth Request Time, Hong was transferred to Team HII following the disbandment of Team XII as part of the SNH48 Team Shuffle.

Discography

With SNH48

EPs

With Color Girls
 美少女时代 (2016)

Units

SNH48 Stage Units

Concert units

Personal life
Since April 2018, Hong and her family moved to Osaka, Japan for her further school studies.

References

External links
 Official Member Profile 
 
 

2001 births
Living people
SNH48 members
Actresses from Shanghai
Chinese child singers
Chinese Mandopop singers
21st-century Chinese actresses
Singers from Shanghai